My Honourable Mrs is a British comedy television series which originally aired on BBC 1 in summer 1975. Centred around a fictional female politician, it was broadcast a few months after Margaret Thatcher was elected leader of the Conservative Party. Henry Prendergast (Derek Nimmo) is a publisher whose life is thrown out of balance when his wife Jane (Pauline Yates) is elected as Tory MP.

Main cast
 Derek Nimmo as Henry Prendergast
 Pauline Yates as Jane Prendergast
 Aubrey Woods as Trevor Crichton
 Anthony Howden as Tim
 Sylvestra Le Touzel as Sarah
 Nicholas Drake as William
 Alan Curtis as Eric Forbes
 Caroline Dowdeswell as Susan

References

Bibliography
 Steven Fielding. A State of Play: British Politics on Screen, Stage and Page, from Anthony Trollope to The Thick of It. A&C Black, 2014.

External links
 

1975 British television series debuts
1975 British television series endings
1970s British comedy television series
BBC television sitcoms
English-language television shows